Căciulata may refer to several villages in Romania:

 a village in Râciu Commune, Mureș County
 a village in the town of Călimăneşti, Vâlcea County